Soyulan (also, Söylən) is a village and municipality in the Tartar Rayon of Azerbaijan.  It has a population of 431.

References 

Populated places in Tartar District